Binaba is a rural village in the Bawku West District of the Upper East Region in north Ghana. The village is 15 km south of the district capital Zebilla.

Geography
There is a dry season, which includes Haramattan winds from mid-November through late March. The rainy season consists of monsoon rains.

Economy
The principal economic activity is agriculture based on a unimodal distribution of rain.  Staple crops include millet, rice and corn. Other important food crops include shea, peanuts, sweet potatoes, mangoes, watermelons and leafy vegetables.

Demographics

Population
There are approximately 65,000 people in Binaba and the surrounding villages of Kusanaba, Zongoyiri, Gori, Kopella, Azuera, Tamocka and Dagunga.

References

Populated places in the Upper East Region